The Socialist Party, was a political party in Sweden active from 1929 to 1948. Led by Karl Kilbom and Nils Flyg, the party was founded in 1929 as a splinter group of the Communist Party of Sweden. Until 1934, the splinter group used the same name Communist Party of Sweden, so in order to keep the two factions apart, this faction was generally known as Kilbommare ("Kilbomiars") while those who stayed in the old party were known as Sillénare ("Sillénians", after their leader Hugo Sillén).

In the split, the entire communist parliamentary group, the party's official newspaper, Folkets Dagblad Politiken, and most of the more militant members joined the Kilbom-Flyg faction.

History
The Kilbom-led SKP held its congress prior to the Sillén-led party. At the congress there was a debate regarding the character of the party, whether to continue the system of party cells (the structure of the pre-split SKP) or whether to become a more open mass party. In the end the statues adopted by the congress differed little from those of the pre-split SKP. Party cells remained the basic organization of the party, and in places where no cell existed a party member would be organized in the arbetarkommun directly. However the criteria for membership were relaxed, the sole remaining criterion was activism in the base level organization.

In 1930 Flyg, as an MP, put forward a motion on separation of church and state. The motion was voted down in the Lower House.

The Kilbom party merged in 1934 with a break-away group of the Social Democrats based in Gothenburg, led by Albin Ström. At the time of the merger, the party changed its name to the Socialist Party (Socialistiska partiet). The transformation into SP also marked a break with the previous line of the party towards the Comintern and the Soviet Union. Initially the party had tried to persuade the Comintern to be allowed to return to the International. Gradually, however the party became more and more antagonistic toward the Comintern and the Soviet Union.

The party gradually disintegrated, and many of the most prominent leaders such as Kilbom, left the party in 1937. During World War II, their staunch anti-Soviet line led the party to actually embrace some pro-German views (partially since the huge financial problems of the party led it to seek financial aid from Germany). As a result of this, in 1940, a group of members that included Albin Ström and Evald Höglund broke away and formed the Left Socialist Party. In the elections the same year, the party lost its parliamentary representation.

When Flyg died in 1943 he was succeeded as party leader by Agaton Blom. During the final years of the war, the party continued to lose members and support, and changed its name to the Swedish Socialist Party (Svenska socialistiska partiet), which was outspokenly supportive of Nazi ideology. The party was finally dissolved in 1948.

The local units of the party were known as "Socialist Labour Communes" (Socialistiska Arbetarkommuner).

In terms of international contacts, the party was initially associated with the International Communist Opposition and later with the International Revolutionary Marxist Centre (also known as the "London Bureau").

The youth league of the party was called the Socialist Youth League (Socialistiska ungdomsförbundet), affiliated to the International Bureau of Revolutionary Youth Organizations.

Electoral results

Electoral results of the party (in elections to the Riksdag):

See also
 Left Socialist Party (Sweden), Vänstersocialistiska partiet, 1940–1963)
 Socialist Party (Sweden, 1971)

Notes

References

 Per-Anders Lundh: Socialistiska Partiet 1929-1945 Swedish only. Retrieved 2012-04-13
 Bernt Kennerström (1974): Mellan två internationaler – Socialistiska Partiet 1929-37 Swedish only. Retrieved 2012-04-13
 Blomqvist, Håkan: Gåtan Nils Flyg och nazismen 
 Hübinette, Tobias (2002). Den svenska nationalsocialismen - medlemmar och sympatisörer 1931-45.

External links
1932 election manifesto of the party

1929 establishments in Sweden
1948 disestablishments in Sweden
Defunct communist parties in Sweden
International Revolutionary Marxist Centre
Political parties disestablished in 1948
Political parties established in 1929
Right Opposition